Zanna is a surname. Notable people with the surname include:

Ahmed Zanna (1955–2015), Nigerian politician
Antonella Zanna, Italian-Norwegian mathematician
Francesco De Zanna (1905–1989), Italian bobsledder
Mark Zanna (1944–2020), Canadian social psychologist
Talib Zanna (born 1990), Nigerian basketball player in the Israel Basketball Premier League